Ginga Munetomo (棟朝 銀河, Munemoto Ginga, born 7 April 1994) is a Japanese trampoline gymnast. He competed in the trampoline competition at the 2016 Summer Olympics, where he finished in fourth place.

References

External links 
 
 
 

Living people
1994 births
Japanese male trampolinists
Gymnasts at the 2016 Summer Olympics
Olympic gymnasts of Japan
Gymnasts at the 2010 Summer Youth Olympics
People from Nishitōkyō, Tokyo
Gymnasts from Tokyo
21st-century Japanese people